Dumaagiin Sodnom (born 14 July 1933) is a Mongolian political figure who served as Prime Minister of Mongolia from 1984 to 1990.

Biography
Sodnom was born in the Örgön District of Dornogovi Province on 14 July 1933.  He first attended school in the Bayanmönkh district of Khentii Province and then went on to study at the Finance and Economic Technical College in Ulaanbaatar from 1946–1950. He worked as an accountant at the Ministry of Finance for four years and joined the MPRP in 1954 before studying economics at the Higher School of Finance and Economics in Irkutsk from 1954 to 1958.

Sodnom then went on to work his way up through the Finance Ministry until becoming Minister of Finance in 1963, a position he held until 1969. From 1969 to 1972 he served as first deputy chairman of the State Planning Commission and was promoted to chairman in 1972.  In 1974 he was appointed as deputy chairman of the Council of Ministers.

On December 12, 1984 Sodnom was appointed chairman of the Council of Ministers, or prime minister, and was elected a member of the MPRP Politburo following the ouster of Yumjaagiin Tsedenbal from the chairmanship of the Presidium of the People's Great Hural and the ascension of Sodnom's political ally Jambyn Batmönkh to the position. Sodnom held both positions until the resignation of the Politburo and government on March 21, 1990 during anti-government demonstrations.

Sodnom subsequently went on to serve as director of the Mongolian Gazryn Tos petroleum company from 1990 to 2001 and then was appointed as an aide to Prime Minister Puntsagiin Jasrai in 1992.

References

 Sanders, Alan J. K., Historical Dictionary of Mongolia, 1996, .

1933 births
Prime Ministers of Mongolia
Finance ministers of Mongolia
Living people
Mongolian People's Party politicians
Mongolian communists
People from Dornogovi Province